Albright's hereditary osteodystrophy is a form of osteodystrophy, and is classified as the phenotype of pseudohypoparathyroidism type 1A; this is a condition in which the body does not respond to parathyroid hormone.<ref
name="nih"></ref>

Signs and symptoms

The disorder is characterized by the following:
 Hypogonadism
 Brachydactyly syndrome
 Choroid plexus calcification
 Hypoplasia of dental enamel
 Full cheeks
 Hypocalcemic tetany

Individuals with Albright hereditary osteodystrophy exhibit short stature, characteristically shortened fourth and fifth metacarpals, rounded facies, and often mild intellectual deficiency.

Albright hereditary osteodystrophy is commonly known as pseudohypoparathyroidism because the kidney responds as if parathyroid hormone were absent. Blood levels of parathyroid hormone are elevated in pseudohypoparathyroidism due to the hypocalcemia

Genetics
This condition is associated with genetic imprinting. It is thought to be inherited in an autosomal dominant pattern, and seems to be associated with a Gs alpha subunit deficiency.

Mechanism
The mechanism of this condition is due to Gs signaling decrease in hormones having to do with signal transduction which is when a signal from outside cell causes change within the cell (in function). Renal tubule cells only express maternal alleles (variant form of a gene).

Diagnosis
The diagnosis of Albright's hereditary osteodystrophy is based on the following exams below:
 clicical features
 serum calicum, phosphorus, PTH
 Urine test for cAMP and phosphorus

Treatment
Treatment consists of maintaining normal levels of calcium, phosphorus, and vitamin D. Phosphate binders, supplementary calcium and vitamin D will be used as required.

History
The disorder bears the name of Fuller Albright, who characterized it in 1942. He was also responsible for naming it "Sebright bantam syndrome," after the Sebright bantam chicken, which demonstrates an analogous hormone insensitivity.  Much less commonly, the term Martin-Albright syndrome is used, this refers to Eric Martin.

See also 
 Pseudopseudohypoparathyroidism

References

Further reading

External links 

Autosomal dominant disorders
Genodermatoses
Rare diseases
Diseases named for discoverer